Narmashir County is in Kerman province, Iran. The capital of the county is the city of Narmashir. At the 2006 census, the region's population (as Narmashir and Rud Ab Districts of Bam County) was 50,894 in 12,117 households. The following census in 2011 counted 58,229 people in 15,673 households, by which time the two districts had been separated from the county to form Narmashir County. At the 2016 census, the county's population was 54,228 in 16,182 households.

Administrative divisions

The population history and structural changes of Narmashir County's administrative divisions over three consecutive censuses are shown in the following table. The latest census shows two districts, four rural districts, and two cities.

References

 

Counties of Kerman Province